Men, Animals and Sensations (German: Menschen, Tiere, Sensationen) is a 1938 German drama film directed by and starring Harry Piel and also featuring Ruth Eweler and Elisabeth Wendt. It is a circus film. It was shot at the Terra Studios in Berlin with sets designed by the art director Max Knaake. Location filming took place at the Sarrasani circus in Dresden.

Cast
 Harry Piel as 	Robert Hansen / Gen. Bobby / Artist
 Ruth Eweler as 	Fedora
 Elisabeth Wendt as 	Maja de Passy
 Edith Oß as 	Estrella - genannt Ella
 Josef Karma as 	Franz - Tierpfleger
 Egon Brosig as 	Hopkins - Assistent bei Fedora
 Willi Schur as 	Theateragent
 Eugen Rex as 	Der Zauberkünstler
 Franz Arzdorf as Gast in der Hotelbar "Astoria"
 Charly Berger as 	Ringmeister im Varieté
 Raffles Bill as Varietéartist
 Gerhard Dammann as Krause, Hausmeister
 Liesl Eckardt as Garderobenfrau von Fedora
 Charles Francois as 	Ein Ober in der Bar
 Knut Hartwig as 	Ober
 Alfred Karen as 	Portier im Hotel "Imperial"
 Philipp Manning as 	Arzt im Varieté
 Karl Platen as Briefträger
 S.O. Schoening as Direktor	
 Michael von Newlinsky as 	Gast in der Hotelbar "Astoria"
 Aruth Wartan as Falk, Tierpfleger
 Eduard Wenck as Theateragent

References

Bibliography 
 Klaus, Ulrich J. Deutsche Tonfilme: Jahrgang 1938. Klaus-Archiv, 1988.
 Reimer, Robert C. & Reimer, Carol J. Historical Dictionary of German Cinema. Rowman & Littlefield,  2019.
 Rentschler, Eric. The Ministry of Illusion: Nazi Cinema and Its Afterlife. Harvard University Press, 1996.

External links 
 

1938 films
Films of Nazi Germany
German drama films
1930s drama films
1930s German-language films
Films directed by Harry Piel
Tobis Film films
1930s German films
Films shot at Terra Studios
Circus films

de:Menschen, Tiere, Sensationen